Paddington Bear is a 1989–1990 animated television series, the second television adaptation of the children's book series after the 1976–1980 series Paddington. The show was made by Hanna-Barbera in association with Central Independent Television. In the series, the character of an American boy named David—Jonathan and Judy Brown's cousin who arrived in London on the same day as Paddington—was added to the stories. The series, part of The Funtastic World of Hanna-Barbera in 1989, lasted 13 episodes.

Plot
Paddington Bear lives with the Brown family, and their American cousin, David Russell. The story also concerns the housekeeper Mrs. Bird, the antique shop owner Mr. Gruber, and their nasty next-door neighbour Mr. Curry.

Cast

Main
 Charlie Adler as Paddington Bear
 Georgia Brown as Mrs. Bird
 Hamilton Camp as Mr. Gruber
 Tim Curry as Mr. Curry
 Cody Everett as Jonathan Brown
 Katie Johnston as Judy Brown
 John Standing as Mr. Brown
 B. J. Ward as Mrs. Brown
 R.J. Williams as David Russell

Additional voices
 Joe Baker
 Jared Barclay
 Earl Boen
 Victoria Carroll
 Philip L. Clarke
 Barry Dennen
 Richard Doyle
 Paul Eiding
 Judyann Elder
 Richard Erdman
 Jonathan Harris as Sir Huntley Martin
 Stanley Jones
 Rene Levant
 Tress MacNeille
 Laurie Main
 Kenneth Mars as Psychiatrist
 Brian Stokes Mitchell
 Larry Moss
 Rob Paulsen as Lifeguard Instructor
 Henry Polic II as Sir Sealy Bloom
 Clive Revill
 Russi Taylor as Sarah
 Peggy Webber

Crew
 Gordon Hunt – Recording Director
 Andrea Romano – Animation Casting Director
 Jamie Thomason – Talent Coordinator
 Kris Zimmerman – Animation Casting Director

Episodes (1989–1990)

Home media
On August 4, 2020, Warner Archive released Paddington Bear: The Complete Series on DVD in the United States for the first time.

References

External links
 

1989 American television series debuts
1990 American television series endings
1980s American animated television series
1990s American animated television series
1980s British animated television series
1990s British animated television series
American children's animated comedy television series
American children's animated fantasy television series
American television shows based on children's books
British children's animated comedy television series
British children's animated fantasy television series
British television shows based on children's books
English-language television shows
The Funtastic World of Hanna-Barbera
Paddington Bear
Television shows set in London
Television series by Hanna-Barbera
Television series by ITV Studios
Television shows produced by Central Independent Television
Animated television series about bears